Santa María ("St. Mary" in Spanish) is a city and commune in the San Felipe de Aconcagua Province of central Chile's Valparaíso Region.

Geography

Demographics
According to the 2002 census of the National Statistics Institute, Santa María has 12,813 inhabitants (6,427 men and 6,386 women). Of these, 8,126 (63.4%) lived in urban areas and 4,687 (36.6%) in rural areas. The population grew by 10.7% (1,238 persons) between the 1992 and 2002 censuses.

Administration
As a commune, Santa María is a third-level administrative division of Chile, administered by a communal council (consejo comunal), which is headed by a directly elected alcalde. The current alcalde is Claudio Zurita Ibarra (PPD). The communal council has the following members:
 José Grbic Bernal (RN)
 María Cristina Meza Espinoza (PPD)
 Marisol Ponce Cisterna (UDI)
 David Olguín Vargas (PS)
 Eloy Ibacache González (PPD)
 Nelson Lemus Osorio (DC)

Within the electoral divisions of Chile, Santa María is represented in the Chamber of Deputies by Marco Antonio Núñez (PDC) and Gaspar Rivas (RN) as part of the 11th electoral district, together with Los Andes, San Esteban, Calle Larga, Rinconada, San Felipe, Putaendo, Panquehue, Llaillay and Catemu. The commune is represented in the Senate by Ignacio Walker Prieto (PDC) and Lily Pérez San Martín (RN) as part of the 5th senatorial constituency (Valparaíso-Cordillera).

References

External links
 Municipality of Santa María

Populated places in San Felipe de Aconcagua Province
Communes of Chile